Pyershamayskaya (lit: "1st May station") is a Minsk Metro station. It was opened on 28 May 1991.

Gallery

References

Minsk Metro stations
Railway stations opened in 1991
1991 establishments in Belarus